Governor Weeks may refer to:

Frank B. Weeks (1854–1935), 64th Governor of Connecticut
John E. Weeks (1853–1949), 61st Governor of Vermont